Glan Devon is a rural locality in the South Burnett Region, Queensland, Australia.

History 
Grindstone Provisional School opened in 1907. On 1 January 1909 it became Grindstone State School. It closed in 1957. It was located on the north side of Grindstone School Road.

References 

South Burnett Region
Localities in Queensland